The Tracey Fragments may refer to:
 The Tracey Fragments (novel), a novel written by Maureen Medved.
 The Tracey Fragments (film), a 2007 movie directed by Bruce McDonald and starring Elliot Page based on the homonymous novel above.